The Netherlands competed at the 1936 Summer Olympics in Berlin, Germany. 165 competitors, 145 men and 20 women, took part in 75 events in 15 sports.

Medalists

Gold
 Arie van Vliet — Cycling, Men's 1.000m Time Trial 
 Rie Mastenbroek — Swimming, Women's 100m Freestyle 
 Rie Mastenbroek — Swimming, Women's 400m Freestyle 
 Nida Senff — Swimming, Women's 100m Backstroke 
 Willy den Ouden, Rie Mastenbroek, Jopie Selbach, and Tini Wagner — Swimming, Women's 4 × 100 m Freestyle Relay 
 Daan Kagchelland — Sailing, Men's Monotype Class

Silver
 Arie van Vliet — Cycling, Men's 1.000m Sprint (Scratch) 
 Bernhard Leene and Hendrik Ooms — Cycling, Men's 2.000m Tandem 
 Jan de Bruine, Johan Greter, and Henri van Schaik — Equestrian, Jumping Team 
 Rie Mastenbroek — Swimming, Women's 100m Backstroke

Bronze
 Tinus Osendarp — Athletics, Men's 100 metres
 Tinus Osendarp — Athletics, Men's 200 metres
 Jaap Kraaier — Canoeing, Men's K1 1.000m Kayak Singles 
 Nico Tates and Wim van der Kroft — Canoeing, Men's K2 1.000m Kayak Pairs 
 Kees Wijdekop and Piet Wijdekop — Canoeing, Men's F2 10.000m Folding Kayak Pairs 
 Henk de Looper, Jan de Looper, Agathon de Roos, Rein de Waal, Pieter Gunning, Carl Heijbroek, Henri Schnitger, René Sparenberg, Ernst van den Berg, Rudolf van der Haar, Antoine van Lierop, and Max Westerkamp — Field Hockey, Men's Team Competition
 Willem de Vries Lentsch and Bob Maas — Sailing, Men's Star

Athletics

Boxing

Canoeing

Cycling

Eleven cyclists, all men, represented the Netherlands in 1936.

Individual road race
 Nico van Gageldonk
 René van Hove
 Gerrit Schulte
 Philippus Vethaak

Team road race
 Nico van Gageldonk
 René van Hove
 Gerrit Schulte
 Philippus Vethaak

Sprint
 Arie van Vliet

Time trial
 Arie van Vliet

Tandem
 Bernard Leene
 Henk Ooms

Team pursuit
 Chris Kropman
 Adrie Zwartepoorte
 Ben van der Voort
 Gerrit van Wees

Diving

Equestrian

Fencing

Eleven fencers, ten men and one woman, represented the Netherlands in 1936.

Men's foil
 Paul Kunze

Men's épée
 Cornelis Weber
 Willem Driebergen
 Nicolaas van Hoorn

Men's team épée
 Nicolaas van Hoorn, Jan Schepers, Willem Driebergen, Cornelis Weber

Men's sabre
 Pieter van Wieringen
 Frans Mosman
 Antonius Montfoort

Men's team sabre
 Ate Faber, Antonius Montfoort, Frans Mosman, Pieter van Wieringen, Jacob Schriever

Women's foil
 Catharina Maria van der Klaauw

Field hockey

Men's Team Competition
Preliminary Round (Group C)
 Defeated France (3-1)
 Defeated Switzerland (4-1)
 Tied with Belgium (2-2)
Semi Finals
 Lost to Germany (0-3)
Third Place Match
 Defeated France (4-3) →  Bronze Medal
Team Roster
 Henk de Looper
Jan de Looper
Agathon de Roos
Rein de Waal
Pieter Gunning
Carl Heijbroek
Henri Schnitger
René Sparenberg
Ernst van den Berg
Rudolf van der Haar
Antoine van Lierop
Max Westerkamp

Modern pentathlon

Three male pentathletes represented the Netherlands in 1936.

 Alexander van Geen
 Josephus Serré
 Johannes van der Horst

Rowing

The Netherlands had eleven rowers participate in five out of seven rowing events in 1936.

 Men's single sculls
 Hans ten Houten

 Men's coxless pair
 Jan Kramer
 Willem Jens

 Men's coxed pair
 Karel Hardeman
 Ernst de Jonge
 Hans van Walsem (cox)

 Men's coxless four
 Mak Schoorl
 Flip Regout
 Hotse Bartlema
 Simon de Wit

 Men's coxed four
 Mak Schoorl
 Hotse Bartlema
 Flip Regout
 Simon de Wit
 Gerard Hallie (cox)

Sailing

Shooting

Four shooters represented the Netherlands in 1936.

25 m rapid fire pistol
 Dirk van den Bosch

50 m rifle, prone
 Jan Hendrik Brussaard
 Christiaan Both
 Tieleman Vuurman

Swimming

Water polo

Art competitions

References

External links
Official Olympic Reports
International Olympic Committee results database

Nations at the 1936 Summer Olympics
1936
Olympics, Winter